Goodbye, Gloria, Hello! is a 1967 TV play broadcast by the Australian Broadcasting Corporation.  It ran for a little over an hour and aired on the ABC on 10 April 1967. It was written by Peter Kenna.

Plot
According to the Sydney Morning Herald, "a stuffed dog, a canary and a lodger come first in what loosely may be termed Gloria's affection." A hen pecked husband, Clive, decides there must be at least one way of getting rid of his wife, Gloria.

Cast
Brigid Lenihan as Gloria
Joan MacArthur as Gloria's vengeful sister
Brian James as Clive
William Hodge as Hopgood the lodger
John Roddick
William Hodge

Reception
The Age called it "exciting... something to see."

1964
The play had aired on the BBC in 1964 as Goodbye Gloria Goodbye. The Sunday Times said it was "not wholly successful, but... of a distinctive flavour"

See also
List of television plays broadcast on Australian Broadcasting Corporation (1960s)

References

External links

Complete script at National Archives of Australia

Australian television plays
Australian Broadcasting Corporation original programming
English-language television shows
Australian live television shows
Black-and-white Australian television shows
1967 television plays